Fort Lee is a historic American Revolutionary War fort in Salem, Massachusetts.  The site, located at a high point next to Fort Avenue on Salem Neck, is a relatively rare fortification from that period whose remains are relatively unaltered. It is an irregular 5-pointed star fort. Although there is some documentary evidence that the Neck was fortified as early as the 17th century, the earthworks built in 1776 are the first clear evidence of the site's military use. Reportedly, the fort had a garrison of 3 officers and 100 artillerymen with 16 guns. The site, of which only overgrown earthworks and a stone magazine survive, was repaired in the 1790s, and rebuilt for the American Civil War. A state cultural resource document states that the fort has not been much modified since the Revolution, and has not been built over.  It was garrisoned by the Massachusetts militia in the War of 1812, abandoned afterwards, and rebuilt with four 8-inch columbiads in the Civil War. An Army engineer drawing dated 1872 depicts the fort's five-pointed trace and the four Civil War gun positions. It was also garrisoned during the Spanish–American War.

The property was federalized in 1867, and transferred to the City of Salem in 1922.  The site was briefly rehabilitated at the time of the United States bicentennial in 1976, with trails and interpretive signs, but these were later removed, and the site has again become overgrown. Earthworks and a stone magazine remain. The fort site was listed on the National Register of Historic Places in 1994.

See also
Fort Pickering
National Register of Historic Places listings in Salem, Massachusetts
National Register of Historic Places listings in Essex County, Massachusetts
 List of military installations in Massachusetts

References

External links
Salem Web guide to Salem Willows including aerial photo of Fort Lee

Lee
Buildings and structures in Salem, Massachusetts
Lee
Lee
Lee
Lee
National Register of Historic Places in Salem, Massachusetts
American Revolution on the National Register of Historic Places